Thaaraavu is a 1981 Indian Malayalam film, directed by Jeassy and produced by N. Premkumar and N. K. Ramachandran. The film stars Madhu, Srividya, Sankaradi and Shubha in the lead roles. The film has musical score by K. J. Yesudas.

Cast
 
Madhu 
Srividya 
Sankaradi 
Shubha 
Ambika 
M. G. Soman 
Mala Aravindan 
Master Rajakumaran Thampi

Soundtrack
The music was composed by K. J. Yesudas and the lyrics were written by O. N. V. Kurup.

References

External links
 

1981 films
1980s Malayalam-language films